Lists of churches in Cumbria may be found in the six lists for each of the ceremonial county's constituent districts.

 List of churches in Allerdale
 List of places of worship in Barrow-in-Furness
 List of churches in the City of Carlisle
 List of churches in Copeland
 List of churches in Eden District
 List of churches in South Lakeland

A summary of statistics is given below.

*numbers may not add to total due to some churches counting towards more than one denomination

Map of medieval parish churches
For the purposes of this map medieval is taken to be pre-1485. It is of note that Cumbria, unlike most parts of England, saw a sustained programme of church building during the 16th and 17th centuries as the more remote parts of the district were settled.

 
Cumbria
Churches